Rajmata (lit. king's mother) is an Indian term used for the mother of the head of a princely family in India.

Examples include 
 Rajmata Jijau, mother of Shivaji
Rajmata Vijaya Raje Scindia of Gwalior, mother of  Madhavrao Scindia
 Rajmata Gayatri Devi of Jaipur, step-mother of Bhawani Singh
 Rajmata Padmini Devi of Jaipur, wife of late Bhawani Singh
 Rajmata Krishna Kumari of Marwar (Jodhpur), mother of Gaj Singh
 Rajmata Mohinder Kaur of Patiala, mother of Amarinder Singh. 
 Rajmata Ahilyabai Holkar

Rajmata Scindia of Gwalior was once termed "Narajmata" (angry mother) by the erstwhile chief minister of Madhya Pradesh Dwarka Prasad Mishra, her political opponent.

References

Hindi words and phrases
Honorifics